Karl Friedrich, Duke of Saxe-Meiningen (Meiningen, 18 July 1712 – Meiningen, 28 March 1743), was a duke of Saxe-Meiningen.

He was the fourth but third surviving son of Ernst Ludwig I, Duke of Saxe-Meiningen and his first wife, Dorothea Marie of Saxe-Gotha-Altenburg.

Karl Friedrich inherited the duchy of Saxe-Meiningen when his father died in 1724, along with his older brother, Ernst Ludwig II, under the guardianship of his uncles Frederick Wilhelm and Anton Ulrich until 1733.

When his older brother died unmarried in 1729, Karl Frederick ruled alone until his death.

Like his brother, he never married, and, after his death, was succeeded by his uncle, Friedrich Wilhelm.

Ancestry

References 
 Hannelore Schneider: Das Herzogtum Sachsen-Meiningen unter seinen ersten Herzögen. Südthüringer Forschungen, Heft 27, 300 Jahre Schloss Elisabethenburg, Meiningen 1994.
 L. Hertel: Meiningische Geschichte von 1680 bis zur Gegenwart. Schriften des Vereins für Sachsen-Meiningische Geschichte und Landeskunde, 47. Heft, Hildburghausen 1904.

1712 births
1743 deaths
House of Saxe-Meiningen
Dukes of Saxe-Meiningen
People from Meiningen
Princes of Saxe-Meiningen
Recipients of the Order of the White Eagle (Poland)